Red Murff Field is a baseball venue located in Belton, TX and home to the Mary Hardin-Baylor Crusaders baseball program of the American Southwest Conference. The field is named after Red Murff, who initiated the UMHB baseball program. The ballpark holds a capacity of 700.

First Game
The Crusaders played their first game at Red Murff Field on February 22, 2005 beating Southwestern Assemblies of God University by a score of 6 to 5.

References

Baseball venues in Texas